Altona, also called Hamburg-Altona, is the westernmost urban borough (Bezirk) of the German city state of Hamburg, on the right bank of the Elbe river. From 1640 to 1864, Altona was under the administration of the Danish monarchy. Altona was an independent borough until 1937. In 2016 the population was 270,263.

History 
Altona was founded in 1535 as a village of fishermen in what was then Holstein-Pinneberg. In 1640, Altona came under Danish rule as part of Holstein-Glückstadt, and in 1664 was granted municipal rights by the Danish King Frederik III, who then ruled in personal union as Duke of Holstein. Altona was one of the Danish monarchy's most important harbor towns. The railroad from Altona to Kiel, the Hamburg-Altona–Kiel railway, was opened in 1844.

Because of severe restrictions on the number of Jews allowed to live in Hamburg until 1864 (with the exception of 1811–1815), a major Jewish community developed in Altona starting in 1611, when Count Ernest of Schaumburg and Holstein-Pinneberg granted the first permanent residence permits to Ashkenazic Jews. Members did business both in Hamburg and in Altona itself. All that remains after the Nazi Holocaust during World War II are the Jewish cemeteries, but in the 17th, 18th, and 19th centuries, the community was a major center of Jewish life and scholarship. Holstein-Pinneberg and later Danish Holstein had lower taxes and placed fewer civil impositions on their Jewish community than did the government of Hamburg.

The wars between Denmark and the German Confederation — the First Schleswig War (1848–1851) and the Second Schleswig War (February–October 1864) — and the Gastein Convention of 1864, led to Denmark's cession of the Duchies of Schleswig and Holstein to Prussian administration and Lauenburg to Austrian administration. Along with all of Schleswig-Holstein, Altona became part of the Kingdom of Prussia in 1867.

In 1871, Altona became a part of the German Empire. In the same year, the town was hit by cholera, with a minimum of 16 casualties in Altona.

During the Weimar era following World War I, the town of Altona was disturbed by major labor strikes and street disorders. Inflation in Germany was a major problem. In 1923, Max Brauer, the mayor of Altona, directed that town personnel should be paid in part with gas meter tokens, as the tokens did not lose value from inflation. The most notable event at that time was the Altona Bloody Sunday on 17 July 1932, when 18 people were killed, all but two by police, during a violent clash between Nazi marchers and members or supporters of the Communist Party. After police raids and a special court, on 1 August 1933, Bruno Tesch and others were found guilty and put to death by beheading with a hand-held axe. In the 1990s, the Federal Republic of Germany reversed the convictions of Tesch and the other men who were put to death, clearing their names.

In 1938, the Greater Hamburg Act removed Altona from the Free State of Prussia in 1937 and merged it (and several surrounding towns) with the Free and Hanseatic City of Hamburg.

On 1 February 2007, the Ortsämter (district offices) in Hamburg were done away with. In Altona, the districts of Blankenese, Lurup and Osdorf had existed and had local offices. On 1 March 2008, the Schanzenviertel neighborhood, which had spanned parts of the boroughs of Altona, Eimsbüttel and Hamburg-Mitte, became the Sternschanze quarter, the entirety of which is now in the Altona borough.

Geography 

The border of Altona to the south is the River Elbe, and across the river the state of Lower Saxony and the boroughs of Harburg and Hamburg-Mitte. To the east is the borough of Hamburg-Mitte and to the north is the borough of Eimsbüttel. The western border is with the state of Schleswig-Holstein. According to the statistical office of Hamburg, Altona has an area of 77.5 km2 or 29.9 sq mi in 2006.

Quarters 
Politically, the following quarters are part of Altona borough:
 Altona-Altstadt
 Altona-Nord
 Bahrenfeld
 Ottensen
 Othmarschen (including parts of Klein Flottbek)
 Groß Flottbek
 Osdorf
 Lurup
 Nienstedten (including parts of Klein Flottbek)
 Blankenese
 Iserbrook
 Sülldorf
 Rissen
 Sternschanze

Demographics 
In 2018, Altona had a population of 274,702 people. 18.0% are children under the age of 18 and 17.9% are 65 years of age or older. 16.2% are immigrants. 5.0% of people are registered as unemployed. In 2018, 53,4% of all households are single-person households.

There are 195 kindergartens and 31 primary schools in Altona as well as 879 physicians in private practice, 254 dentists and 60 pharmacies.

Politics 

Simultaneously with elections to the state parliament (Bürgerschaft), the Bezirksversammlung is elected as representatives of the citizens. It consists of 51 representatives.

Elections 

|-
! colspan="2" style="text-align:left;" | Parties
! %
! ±
! Seats
|-
| style="background-color:" |
| style="text-align:left;" | Alliance 90/The Greens
| 35.1
|  13.0
| style="text-align:center;" | 18
|-
| style="background-color:" |
| style="text-align:left;" | Social Democratic Party
| 20.4
|  9.6
| style="text-align:center;" | 11
|-
| style="background-color:" |
| style="text-align:left;" | Christian Democratic Union
| 16.6
|  6.7
| style="text-align:center;" | 9
|-
| style="background-color:" |
| style="text-align:left;" | The Left
| 14.8
|  0.8
| style="text-align:center;" | 8
|-
| style="background-color:" |
| style="text-align:left;" | Free Democratic Party
| 6.8
|  2.4
| style="text-align:center;" | 3
|-
| style="background-color:" |
| style="text-align:left;" | Alternative for Germany
| 4.4
|  1.1
| style="text-align:center;" | 2
|-
| style="background-color:" |
| style="text-align:left;" | Pirate Party
| 1.4
|  1.1
| style="text-align:center;" | 0
|-
| style="background-color:#eeeeee" |
| style="text-align:left;" | Others
| 0.6
|  0.2
| style="text-align:center;" | 0
|-
! colspan="2" style="text-align:left;" | Total
! style="text-align:center;" colspan="2"|
! style="text-align:center;" | 51
|}

Transport 

Altona is the location of a major railway station, Hamburg-Altona, connecting the Hamburg S-Bahn with the regional railways and local bus lines.

The A 7 autobahn passes through Altona borough.

According to the Department of Motor Vehicles (Kraftfahrt-Bundesamt), in Altona 87,131 private cars were registered (359 cars per 1000 people).

Notable people 
 Jean de Labadie (1610–1674), French Christian mystic who died in Altona.
 Gluckel of Hameln (1646–1724)
 Jonathan Eybeschutz (1690–1764), was a Talmudist, Halachist, and Kabbalist who died in Altona.
 Jacob Emden (1697–1776), was a Talmudist, Halachist, and Kabbalist who lived most his life in Altona.
 Johann Friedrich Struensee (1737–1772), doctor of medicine, de facto ruler of Denmark
 Jens Jacob Eschels (1757–1842), nautical captain, author of the oldest known captain's autobiography in Germany (Born in Nieblum, died in Altona).
 Conrad Hinrich Donner (1774–1854), banker and philanthropist, of Donners Park, Altona
 Johann Heinrich Wohlien (1779–1842), organ builder
 Akiba Israel Wertheimer (1778–1835), was chief Rabbi in Altona from 1815–35
 George Jarvis (Philhellene) (1797–1828), was the first of the American Philhellenes who took part in the Greek Revolution 1821–1829, general of Greek army, born in Altona.
 Johannes Groenland (1824–1891), botanist and microscopist who worked for Louis de Vilmorin in Paris and was born in Altona.
 Carl Reinecke (1824–1910), composer, conductor, and pianist was born in Altona
 Carl Semper (1832–1893), German ethnologist and animal ecologist
 Georg Semper (1837–1909), German entomologist
 Sophie Wörishöffer (1838–1890), was a writer of adventure stories for young people who died in Altona.
 Bernhard von Bülow (1849–1929), German politician and chancellor
 Constantin Brunner (1862–1937), German philosopher, grandson of Akiba Israel Wertheimer, was born in Altona
 Karl Yens (1868–1945), plein-air painter of Southern California, born in Altona.
 Carl F. W. Borgward (1890–1963), German engineer, car designer and businessman
 Johannes de Boer (1897–1986), Highly decorated Generalleutnant during World War II, was born in Altona.
 Louise Schroeder (1887–1957), German politician (SPD)
 Carl Theodor Sørensen, (1893–1979), Danish landscape architect was born in Altona
 Fatih Akın, (born 1973), Turkish film director was raised in Altona
 Eric Maxim Choupo-Moting, (born 1989), Cameroonian footballer was born in Altona

See also 
Altonaer FC von 1893 Football club based in the area.
Hamburg-Altona electoral district, covering the borough
Altona, Victoria, Australia – a suburb of Melbourne, Australia, named after Altona, Hamburg
Altoona, Pennsylvania – named after Altona, Hamburg
850 Altona, an asteroid named after Altona, Hamburg

References

General sources 

 Statistical office Hamburg and Schleswig-Holstein Statistisches Amt für Hamburg und Schleswig-Holstein, official website 
Act of the areal organisation, 6 July 2006 Gesetz über die räumliche Gliederung der Freien und Hansestadt Hamburg (RäumGiG)  
 Stolpersteine Hamburg Stolpersteine in Hamburg

External links 

 
 altona.INFO newspaper with daily local information
 
 The Jewish Community of Altona, The Museum of the Jewish People at Beit Hatfutsot

 
Boroughs of Hamburg
Altona
Populated places established in 1535
1535 establishments in the Holy Roman Empire